Aglaoapis tridentata is a species of cuckoo bee belonging to the family Megachilidae.

It is native to Europe.

References

Megachilidae
Insects described in 1848